Fighter Squadron 122 or VF-122 was an aviation unit of the United States Navy. Originally established as Reserve Squadron 783 (VF-783) it was called to active duty on 2 August 1950, it was re-designated VF-122 on 4 February 1953 and disestablished on 10 April 1958.

Operational history

During this deployment VF-783 lost 8 F4U-4s and 3 pilots killed.

VF-783/VF-122 was assigned to Carrier Air Group Twelve (CVG-12) aboard , which was deployed to Korea from 15 September 1952 to 18 May 1953. It lost 4 F9F-5s and 2 pilots killed.On 13 April 1953, the engine of an F9F Panther from the squadron flamed out during a photo reconnaissance mission and the pilot Lt(jg) Roy Tailor was killed when he attempted to ditch the plane at sea. On 20 April 1953, pilot Randolph T. Scoggan was killed when his F9F Panther was shot down by antiaircraft fire and crashed into the sea.

VF-122 was assigned to Air Task Group 3 (ATG-3) aboard  for a Western Pacific deployment from 5 January to 23 June 1956.

Home port assignments

Aircraft assignment
F4U-4 Corsair
F9F-5 Panther
F9F-8 Cougar
F3H-2N Demon

See also
History of the United States Navy
List of inactive United States Navy aircraft squadrons
List of United States Navy aircraft squadrons

References

External links

Strike fighter squadrons of the United States Navy